Palladium(IV) fluoride, also known as palladium tetrafluoride, is the chemical compound of palladium and fluorine with the chemical formula PdF4. The palladium atoms in PdF4 are in the +4 oxidation state.

Synthesis
Palladium tetrafluoride has been prepared by reacting palladium(II,IV) fluoride with fluorine gas at pressures around 7 atm and at 300 °C for several days.

Reactivity
PdF4 is a strong oxidising agent and undergoes rapid hydrolysis in moist air.

See also
 Palladium fluorides

References

Palladium compounds
Fluorides
Platinum group halides